Kučuk-Alija (1801 – 5 August 1804) was a Janissary, mutesellim of Kragujevac and one of four Dahiyas (leaders of rebel Janissaries) who controlled the Sanjak of Smederevo (aka "Belgrade Pashalik") in the period between 15 December 1801 (when he killed Belgrade's vizier Hadži Mustafa Pasha) and the beginning of the First Serbian Uprising in Spring 1804. He was a brother of Sali Aga, a mutesellim of Rudnik Ottoman nahiyah at the beginning of 19th century.

Biography
Alija was born in the Rudnik nahiyah and belonged to the Đevrlić family.   He advanced in Ottoman service from regular Janissary to the position of mutesellim of Kragujevac. Recruited from the local Muslim population, he was a Yamak.

Together with other renegade Janissaries, Alija captured Hadži Mustafa Pasha, the Vizier of Belgrade, in October 1801 and killed him on 15 December 1801 in the Belgrade Fortress. After the murder, Alija became one of four leaders, known as dahije, who ruled the Sanjak of Smederevo (also known as the Belgrade Pashalik), alongside Aganlija, Mula Jusuf and Mehmed-aga Fočić. His wife was the sister of one of his military commanders.

In early March 1804, at the beginning of the First Serbian Uprising, rebels besieged Rudnik which was under control of Sali Aga, Kuchuk's brother. When four dahiyahs were informed about the rebellion they agreed that Kuchuk Ali should go from Belgrade to Rudnik with 600 Janissaries to release Rudnik from siege and to advance with his forces to Šabac through Valjevo, while Belgrade was left under protection of three remaining dahiyahs. According to some sources Kuchuk Ali had intention to first go to Kragujevac to gather more forces then to Jagodina to hire Halil Gušanac and his Arnauts and then to attack rebels. Gušanac with 1,600 Arnauts and Krdžalijas were sent by Osman Pazvantoğlu to help dahiyah in suppressing the rebellion.

When Kuchuk Ali advanced toward south he did not have information that rebels already captured Rudnik on 11 March. He attacked Karađorđe who was with Janko Katić and around hundred rebels in Vrbica, waiting for other rebels to join them. Kuchuk Ali was informed about Karađorđe's position by knez Maksim from Guberevac who was later killed by the rebels because of his treason. Karađorđe and his forces fled from the battle. After battle in Vrbica Kuchuk Ali and his horsemen continued their journey through Šumadija and reached Ćuprija and Jagodina via Kragujevac on 15 March 1804. The rebels followed him and captured Kragujevac on 4 April 1804 after Kuchuk Ali already left it, taking 200 Janissaries from Kragujevac with him.

The rebels attacked Kuchuk's forces near Avala and inflicted significant casualties to them.

Kučuk Alija and other dahiyas fled from Belgrade abandoning their followers and went by boats to Ada Kaleh island on the Danube. The rebel forces led by Milenko Stojković soon captured and executed them, with full knowledge and approval of the Ottoman authorities. Their bodies were decapitated and their heads (without head of Aganlija which was mistakenly dropped into Danube) were taken to the rebel camp on Vračar in Belgrade.

References 

Civil servants from the Ottoman Empire
Military personnel of the Ottoman Empire
1804 deaths
People from the Ottoman Empire of Serbian descent
Year of birth missing
Ottoman military personnel of the Serbian Revolution
Leaders who took power by coup
Janissaries
Rebels from the Ottoman Empire
People from Gornji Milanovac